The 2022 New Mexico United season will be the fourth season for New Mexico United in the USL Championship, the second-tier professional soccer league in the United States. This article covers the period from November 30, 2021 to the conclusion of the 2022 USL playoff final. The 2022 USL Championship season is set to begin on March 12, with New Mexico United set to play their first competitive game against Las Vegas Lights FC.

Off-season and pre-season 
The club concluded its 2021 season with a 3-1 win over Real Monarchs on October 30. Finishing 5th in the Mountain Division, New Mexico failed to qualify for the USL Championship playoffs. Following the conclusion of the season, Saalih Muhammad's loan spell ended, and he returned to Oakland Roots SC.

Six days later, on November 5 the club announced the departure of inaugural head coach Troy Lesesne after three seasons. His successor, Zach Prince, was announced on November 15, having served as Lesesne's assistant for the past three seasons.

In December, Justin Schmidt and Juan Pablo Guzmán left the club, with the former retiring from playing to join the US Army. December also saw 5 players join the club. Justin Portillo joined from Real Monarchs on December 18, followed by the signing of Haitian youth international Carl Sainté on December 22 from Haitian side Violette AC, and Comorian international Alexis Souahy on December 28 from Louisville City FC. United finished the calendar year by announcing the signings of Tabort Etaka Preston and Neco Brett on December 29 from Hartford Athletic and December 31 from Birmingham Legion FC, respectively.

In January, midfielder Will Seymore joined the club from Finn Harps F.C. On January 8, New Mexico announced the signing of Raddy Ovouka from Ghanaian side Accra Hearts of Oak. Second-choice goalkeeper Philipp Beigl left the club on January 10, moving to El Paso Locomotive. Forward Brian Brown left the club on January 25 in a player transfer with FC Tulsa for Jerome Kiesewetter. Isidro Martinez left the club on January 27, followed the next day by the announcement of the club's 2022 roster, which did not include Will Palmquist, David Najem, Alex Touche, Andrew Tinari, or Devon Sandoval.

March 
On March 1, the club announced the signing of goalkeeper and Albuquerque native Ford Parker from Birmingham Legion. New Mexico United began its competitive season on March 13, winning their home and season opener 2-0 over Las Vegas Lights. The team was unbeaten in their 4 competitive matches in March, beating El Paso Locomotive away on March 19 before consecutive home draws to Orange County SC and Oakland Roots on March 26 and 30, respectively.

Club roster

Transfers out

Transfers in

Loans in

Competitions

Friendlies 

In January, New Mexico United announced a series of three pre-season friendly matches in San Diego in February against San Diego Loyal SC, Vancouver Whitecaps FC, Orange County SC. Followed by a friendly in El Paso against El Paso Locomotive, before finishing up the pre-season schedule at home versus USL League 1 expansion side Northern Colorado Hailstorm FC at United's home training facility.

Results

USL Championship 

On December 21, the USL announced the competition format for the 2022 season. New Mexico United was placed into a 13-team Western Conference, and will play 34 games in the regular season; a double round robin against conference opponents with an additional 10 games against various opponents from around the league. New Mexico United and the USL announced the full schedule on January 13.

Conference table

Results summary

Results by matchday

Matches 

source:

USL Championship playoffs

Results

U.S. Open Cup 

New Mexico United will enter the U.S. Open Cup in the Second Round, to be played between April 5 and April 7. The Second Round draw took place on February 11, 2022, where it was announced that United would face the winner of the opening round match between Park City Red Wolves SC and Las Vegas Legends. After defeating the Park City Red Wolves in the first round, Las Vegas Legends were defeated by United in the second. For the third round, New Mexico United were placed into the Mountain regional draw, along with fellow USL Championship member Phoenix Rising, USL League One side Northern Colorado Hailstorm FC, and MLS side Real Salt Lake. Along with Northern Colorado, United declined to host in this round, so they were drawn to determine who would visit Wild Horse Pass, and who would visit Rio Tinto Stadium. As it happened, United were drawn away to Phoenix. This made their third round match their second consecutive match-up with Phoenix.

Statistics

USL Championship

Outfield players

Goalkeepers

U.S. Open Cup

Outfield Players

Goalkeepers

Notes

References 

New Mexico United
New Mexico
New Mexico
New Mexico United